And the band played on is an expression used to describe the deliberate masking or downplaying of an impending calamity by authorities.

The expression is reflected in:

Films
 And the Band Played On (film), a 1993 American television film docudrama based on Randy Shilts' book

Literature
 And the Band Played On: People, Politics, and the AIDS Epidemic (1987), a nonfiction book by Randy Shilts
 And the Band Played On...: The Titanic Violinist and the Glovemaker: A True Story of Love, Loss and Betrayal (2011), a nonfiction book by Christopher Ward
 The Band that Played On: The Extraordinary Story of the 8 Musicians Who Went Down with the Titanic (2011), a nonfiction book by Steve TurnerMusic

Albums
 And the Band Played On... (album), a 1998 album by The Jaggerz

Songs
 "The Band Played On" (1895), a popular song that popularized the phrase in its chorus
 "Ball of Confusion" (1970), phrase is mentioned repeatedly in the song by The Temptations
 The Band Plays On (1975), the debut album from Back Street Crawler
 And the Bands Played On (1981), a song by Saxon

EpisodesAnd the Band Played On'', a Shining Time Station 1989 episode